Recording N.Y.C. 1986 is an album by David Murray (also known by the eponymous title David Murray) released on the Japanese DIW label in 1986. It features six quartet performances by Murray with Fred Hopkins, James Blood Ulmer and Sunny Murray.

Reception
The Allmusic review awarded the album 3 stars.

Track listing
All compositions by David Murray except as indicated
 "Red Car" (Butch Morris) - 4:00 
 "Long Goodbye" (Morris) 4:35 
 "Kareem" - 8:30 
 "According To Webster" - 11:15 
 "Patricia" - 9:35 
 "Light Years" - 14:15

Personnel
David Murray - tenor saxophone
James Blood Ulmer - guitar
Fred Hopkins - bass
Sunny Murray - drums

References 

1986 albums
David Murray (saxophonist) albums
DIW Records albums